Alexander Vladimirovich Murylev (born March 31, 1971), known as Yeltsin's Sanitary, is a Russian serial killer and former real estate broker, who, between 1993 and 1994, killed several people in order to seize and then sell their apartments.

Biography 
Alexander Murylev was born in 1971 in the family of an officer of the Soviet Army. Before coming of age, he lived with his family in East Germany, where his father held a high position in the counterintelligence headquarters of the Group of Soviet Forces.

Returning to the USSR, Murylev enrolled into a medical school. After graduating from it, he went to the army, where he served as a feldsher in a military hospital. After demobilization, Murylev tried to enroll in the MSU Faculty of Journalism, but was unsuccessful. After that, he got a job as a freelance correspondent in a number of Moscow print media. One time he was given a task by the editorial which led him one of the metropolitan casinos, where the young man got addicted to gambling. He began to spend all his free time in gambling houses, and once he lost a very large sum of money. Due to this, he began to commit crimes.

Murders 
Murylev was well versed in the issues of privatization and housing sales, to which his journalistic work contributed a lot. So, in one of the newspapers, shortly before this, an article published by Murylev titled "Small privatization - a great swimming" was followed up by "And what about the big one?", which raised the issue of privatization of real estate in Moscow. Murylev knew that the law was passed in hurry, and for the sale of someone's apartment only one document was enough - a power of attorney could dispose of it.

Murylev carefully investigated the places where marginal personalities gathered, in particular, single alcoholics. He treated his victims to alcohol and having made sure they had no close relatives, he offered to sell or exchange with the surcharge of their apartment. Having heard the sums, huge for them, they agreed and made out powers of attorney on Murylev. After that, Murylev killed them, always using different methods. He always checked the pulse of his victims, until he was convinced that they were dead.

He committed his first murder in July 1993, when he shot a man named Zheleztsov with a harpoon. Murylev then disposed of the body in the Moskva River, where it was later found on July 30. The body could not be identified and was cremated, but a year later, Zheleztsov's brother identified the corpse from his wristwatch, which was preserved by the authorities.

In the same month, Murylev committed two more murders - those of a man named Troshin and his mistress Vinokurova. The double murder was committed at Troshin's apartment, with Murylev wrapping up the bodies in a blanket, calling a taxi, going to another area and subsequently disposing of the corpses by throwing them down a sewer hole. The bodies were discovered a year later, only thanks to Murylev's testimonies. The following murder, that of a man named Sidorov, was done in Murylev's own apartment, where he killed the man with a cleaver.

In September 1993, Murylev tried to persuade a certain Alexander Ershov to issue a power of attorney for him to sell the apartment. Ershov refused, and appealed to the police. A week later, he was killed by Murylev, who took him out of town and shot him with a TT pistol.

Soon after, Murylev killed a mother and daughter named Petukhovi, who suffered from alcoholism. Their bodies were thrown into the sewer hole, where they were soon discovered. The next day, Murylev brought to the same place a man named Bulanenkov, who was in a state of intoxication, putting him on the edge of the sewer hole and waited until the man fell down and drowned.

In the spring of 1994, Murylev began to actively engage in apartment sales, for which he used the services of official real estate companies. During the inspection of one of these apartments, an agent of one company was arrested, who mentioned Murylev. Two days later, Murylev was detained at the Belorussky railway station in Moscow.

Trial and sentence 
Murylev soon confessed to the murders of 8 people, describing in detail his crimes to the investigators. At one of the interrogations, he told the investigator that he was "Yeltsin's Sanitary", helping clear Russia from marginal elements. Some of the bodies were found only after the killer testified.

In 1996, the Moscow City Court sentenced to Alexander Murylev to death, but the sentence was commuted to life imprisonment in a special regime colony according to a moratorium on the death penalty. As of 2021, Murylev was serving his sentence in the White Swan prison. His accomplice, the notary Igor Agarkov, who pledged the false powers of attorney, was sentenced to six years imprisonment.

Subsequently, Murylev assured journalists that he is innocent and is a victim of a judicial error:

See also
 List of Russian serial killers

References 

1971 births
Inmates of White Swan Prison
Living people
Male serial killers
Prisoners sentenced to death by Russia
Real estate brokers
Russian people convicted of murder
Russian serial killers